Dalton Lloyd Truax Jr. (January 17, 1935 – August 15, 2019) was a professional American football player. After growing up in New Orleans and lettering in multiple sports for Holy Cross School (New Orleans) including becoming Louisiana State Wrestling Heavyweight Champ, he went on an athletic scholarship to Tulane University. Shortly before the 1957 season, the Green Bay Packers traded him to the New York Giants for a 1958 third-round selection in which they chose future Hall of Famer Ray Nitschke. He played for the Oakland Raiders during the 1960 AFL season. He died at his home in 2019, aged 84.

References

External links

Oakland Raiders players
Tulane Green Wave football players
1935 births
2019 deaths
Players of American football from New Orleans
American Football League players